Len Doyal FRSA FRSocMed is emeritus professor  of medical ethics at Queen Mary, University of London and a medical ethicist. He was born in Atlanta, Georgia in 1944 and studied philosophy and sociology at Georgia State University, earning his undergraduate degree (with distinction) in 1966. That same year he was awarded a Fulbright Scholarship to study with Karl Popper at the London School of Economics.

Personal life
He is married to Lesley Doyal and they have two children and four grandchildren. He lives in central London and in Perugia, Italy.

Early career
Doyal worked for over two decades at Middlesex University (then Middlesex Polytechnic), developing and teaching a course on the natural and social sciences, political and moral philosophy, as well as politics and philosophy of technology.

In 1986 he was made Principal Lecturer in Philosophy and the same year he published Empiricism, Explanation and Rationality, coauthored with Roger Harris, a popular introduction to philosophy of social sciences.

Medical ethics and law
In the 1980s he became interested in ethics and law applied to medicine and at University College and The Middlesex Hospitals joint medical school he organised and jointly taught on a part-time basis on the subject. The Nuffield Foundation gave him a grant to produce, write and direct a video library and associated teaching materials on informed consent, which was published in 1990.

Doyal was given a joint appointment as senior lecturer in medical ethics in St. Bartholomew's and The Royal London Medical College, University of London in 1990, being made Reader in 1994. He was promoted to Professor of Medical Ethics in 1996. The General Medical Council and General Dental Council both praised his academic programme Ethics and Law Applied to Medicine and Dentistry for the way it integrates law and ethics with clinical practice. In 2000 he was made a Licensed Practitioner within the Higher Education Academy and was awarded the Drapers' Prize for Excellence in Teaching.

Research
Doyal's areas of academic interest in clinical ethics concern the moral foundations of the duties of clinical care, informed consent, medical research, passive and active euthanasia, the rationing of scarce health care resources, the rights of children and the boundaries of respect for confidentiality.

He is an editor of the Journal of Postgraduate Medicine.

Consultancy and other professional practice
Until his retirement, Doyal was an honorary consultant to the Royal Hospitals Trust. He has also consulted, written and lectured extensively.

In 1996, he established the Trust Clinical Ethics Committee, including writing Terms of Reference and drafting policies concerning good professional practice.

Doyal has also been a consultant to many important medical organisations, including the Department of Health, the General Medical Council, the Medical Research Council, the Royal Colleges of Medicine and Surgery and the British Medical Association upon whose Ethics Committee he sat for nearly a decade. Most recently, he chaired the Department of Health Panel on the Ethical Evaluation of Student Projects within Medical Education.

Discussion of controversial issues
One of many issues has discussed publicly is euthanasia. He has advocated that non-voluntary euthanasia should be legal under certain limited circumstances. His position was criticised by Deborah Annetts of Dignity in Dying.

Lecture cancelled because of disruptive protestors
In April 2009, a lecture by Doyal and debate in Cork University Hospital were cancelled after protesters took up positions in the lecture theatre.  Father Paul Kramer, a Catholic priest, was among the protesters and ordered Doyal to leave Ireland. The police who were present made no attempt to stop the protesters. Doyal had to be escorted out by hospital security guards. The talk had been criticised by Bishop John Buckley, Senator Jim Walsh and Senator John Hanafin, though Senator David Norris accused Senator Walsh of scaremongering. The Health Service Executive said the lecture was cancelled for safety reasons.

Books
Empiricism, Explanation and Rationality (with Roger Harris)
A Theory of Human Need (with Ian Gough)
Informed Consent in Medical Research (with Jeff Tobias)

References

Living people
American expatriate academics
Academics of Queen Mary University of London
1944 births
People from Atlanta
Georgia State University alumni
Alumni of the London School of Economics
Academics of Middlesex University
Deutscher Memorial Prize winners